
Ben Lewis is a writer for theatre, radio and television, theatre director and performer, who trained at LAMDA.

He co-created and directed My Name Is Sue (Soho Theatre/touring, Total Theatre Award 2009) and The Village Social (2011) with Dafydd James. Ben has also written two plays for BBC Radio 4: Blue Sky Thinking (9 September 2008) and Tiny (17 September 2010).

He is co-Artistic Director of Inspector Sands, and co-created its shows, If That's All There Is (Edinburgh International Festival Fringe Award 2009) and Hysteria (Total Theatre Award 2006), which have toured extensively in the UK and to countries including the USA, China, Russia, Germany, Romania, Armenia, and most recently to Brits Off Broadway 2010. The company is currently developing its third show, Mass Observation (working title) with support from the Southbank Centre, the National Theatre Studio and the Almeida.

Performances as an actor

Theatre

Radio

References

Alumni of the London Academy of Music and Dramatic Art
British male stage actors
British dramatists and playwrights
British male radio actors
British radio writers
British theatre directors
Living people
British male dramatists and playwrights
Year of birth missing (living people)